Howard Lee "Hokie" Gajan Jr. (September 6, 1959 – April 11, 2016) was an American football running back who played five seasons in the National Football League.

Biography
Gajan played football at Baker High School in Baker, Louisiana, and he received a scholarship to play at Louisiana State University (LSU). He was drafted out of LSU by the New Orleans Saints in the 1981 NFL Draft.

In 1984, the same season Los Angeles Rams running back Eric Dickerson set a new NFL single season rushing record, Gajan led all NFL rushers (with 100 or more attempts) in yards gained per attempt (102 carries, 615 yards; a 6.03 ypc average).  Through 2015, he remains one of 19 NFL running backs to exceed six yards per carry in a (100 or more attempt) season.

Missing the 1986 season due to a knee injury, Gajan retired after the 1987 season after injuring the opposite knee. During his career, Gajan rushed for 1,358 yards and 11 touchdowns, and also had 515 receiving yards and two touchdowns.

Gajan worked as a scout for the Saints before he entered broadcasting. He was the color commentator alongside Jim Henderson on Saints radio broadcasts. In the fall of 2015, he was diagnosed with a rare cancer known as liposarcoma. Gajan died on April 11, 2016. He was the 2016 recipient of the Joe Gemelli Fleur-De-Lis Award, an annual award honoring a person for contributions to the Saints organization.  Gajan's award was voted in March and was announced posthumously.

References

1959 births
2016 deaths
Baker High School (Louisiana) alumni
American football running backs
LSU Tigers football players
New Orleans Saints announcers
New Orleans Saints players
National Football League announcers
Players of American football from Baton Rouge, Louisiana
People from Baker, Louisiana
Deaths from liposarcoma
Deaths from cancer in Louisiana
Ed Block Courage Award recipients
Sportspeople from East Baton Rouge Parish, Louisiana